Lakshmi Vanthachu is a 2015 Indian Tamil-language soap opera that aired on Zee Tamil and it stars Vani Bhojan. The show launched on 2 February 2015, and it aired Monday through Friday at 9:30PM (IST). On 19 June 2017, the show's timeslot moved to 6:30PM IST. The show ended with 720 episodes on 24 November 2017.

The show stars Vani Bhojan, Saran Rajesh, Mohana, Haripriya, and Sulakshana. It was directed by Suresh Krissna and V. Sathasivam.

Plot
Vetrivel, who lives in Pollachi, falls in love with Lakshimi. Lakshimi too loves him. Vetri is from a rich family, but has a bad past. 21 years earlier, his sister killed herself before his family members which confined his mother to a wheelchair and made her unable to speak, walk, or hear. His father, the Nattamai of their village, quits his job to look after his mother. He also has one elder brother who is still unmarried and two younger brothers where one is sent out of their house by his father as he was the main reason for his sister's suicide attempt. On the other hand, Lakshimi is a milk vendor who has three sisters and a mother. She is the only person who works hard for the family. At last, Vetri and Lakshimi decide to marry. On their wedding day, due to her mother's order, Lakshimi cannot come to the temple. After waiting for a long time for Lakshimi, Vetri decides to kill himself as he cannot fetch a bad name to his family, who are eagerly waiting for the arrival of their new daughter in law. Meanwhile, in Chennai, Nandhini, a happy go lucky person, falls in love with Shakthi. Shakthi also loves her. They decide to marry. But Nandhini's greedy caretakers (her father's brother and his wife) fix her marriage with a rich guy for money. Nadhini decides to elope with Shakthi. She escapes from the marriage hall and waits for Shakthi. Shakthi comes there and slaps Nandhini saying bad things about her character and just now he discovers all of Nanhini's flaws. Actually this is done by Anushka, Shakthi's houseowner's daughter, who also loves Shakthi and wants to separate him from Nandhini. Shakthi leaves Nandhini and goes by car. Depressed, Nandhini catches a bus and travels in that bus till its last stop. The bus is to Pollachi. She deboards at Pollachi. After thinking about Shakthi, she decides to commit suicide and goes to the top of a hill. There she meets Vetri who tries to kill himself. She stops him. Both of them narrates their tragic past to each other. After that Nandhini agrees to act like Lakshmi and goes with Vetri to his house. She wins the entire family's hearts.

Cast
 Vani Bhojan as Nandhini / Lakshmi Vetrivel and Jhansi
 Saran Rajesh as Vetrivel
 Benito Franklin Alex as Rishi
 Nathan Shyam as Shakthivel
 Haripriya Vigneshkumar as Anushka Shaktivel
 Krishna Kumar as Thangavel
 Sri Kala Paramasivam as Thenmozhi Thangavel
 Vijay Krishnaraj as Natamai Nachimuthu
 Sulakshana as Valliammai
 Divya Ganesh as Madhumitha

Former
 Sri Vidhya / Shwetha Bandekar as Lakshmi Santhosh
 Mohana as Mohana (Lakshmi's sister)
 Vetrivel as Santhosh
 Devipriya as Kodeeshwari
 Puviarasu as Puvi
 Kavyavarshini as Mahathi Rishi
 Deepa Nethran as Puvi's mother
 Lakshmi Raj as Asst. Commissioner of Police
 Jeeva Ravi as Puvi's Dad (Judge)
 Rajashekhar as Santhosh's father
 Preethi Kumar as Chithra / Jennifer
 Pavithra Janani as Indhu

Airing history 
The show started airing on Zee Tamil on 2 February 2015 and It aired on Monday through Friday at 9:30 pm (IST). Later its timing changed Starting from Monday 19 June 2017, the show was shifted to airs Monday through Friday at 6:30 pm (IST) time Slot. A new show named Rekka Katti Parakkudhu Manasu replaced this show at 9:30 pm (IST).

References

External links
 

Zee Tamil original programming
Tamil-language romance television series
Tamil-language horror fiction television series
Tamil-language melodrama television series
2015 Tamil-language television series debuts
Tamil-language television shows
2017 Tamil-language television series endings
Television shows set in Tamil Nadu